Navobod or Nawobod (Yaghnobi Наԝобод or Навобод) is a village in Sughd Region, northern Tajikistan. It is part of the jamoat Loiq Sherali in the city of Panjakent, east of the central city. The population is majority ethnic Tajik people, with some ethnic Uzbeks settlement.

References

Populated places in Sughd Region